In chemistry, crystallography, and materials science, the coordination number, also called ligancy, of a central atom in a molecule or crystal is the number of atoms, molecules or ions bonded to it. The ion/molecule/atom surrounding the central ion/molecule/atom is called a ligand. This number is determined somewhat differently for molecules than for crystals.

For molecules and polyatomic ions the coordination number of an atom is determined by simply counting the other atoms to which it is bonded (by either single or multiple bonds). For example, [Cr(NH3)2Cl2Br2]− has Cr3+ as its central cation, which has a coordination number of 6 and is described as hexacoordinate. The common coordination numbers are 4, 6 and 8.

Molecules, polyatomic ions and coordination complexes 

In chemistry, coordination number, defined originally in 1893 by Alfred Werner, is the total number of neighbors of a central atom in a molecule or ion. The concept is most commonly applied to coordination complexes.

Simple and commonplace cases
The most common coordination number for d-block transition metal complexes is 6.  The coordination number does not distinguish the geometry of such complexes, i.e. octahedral vs trigonal prismatic.  

For transition metal complexes, coordination numbers range from 2 (e.g., AuI in Ph3PAuCl) to 9 (e.g., ReVII in [ReH9]2−).  Metals in the f-block (the lanthanoids and actinoids) can accommodate higher coordination number due to their greater ionic radii and availability of more orbitals for bonding.  Coordination numbers of 8 to 12 are commonly observed for f-block elements.  For example, with bidentate nitrate ions as ligands, CeIV and ThIV form the 12-coordinate ions [Ce(NO3)6]2− (ceric ammonium nitrate) and [Th(NO3)6]2−.  When the surrounding ligands are much smaller than the central atom, even higher coordination numbers may be possible. One computational chemistry study predicted a particularly stable  ion composed of a central lead ion coordinated with no fewer than 15 helium atoms. Among the Frank–Kasper phases, the packing of metallic atoms can give coordination numbers of up to 16. At the opposite extreme, steric shielding can give rise to unusually low coordination numbers.  An extremely rare instance of a metal adopting a coordination number of 1 occurs in the terphenyl-based arylthallium(I) complex 2,6-Tipp2C6H3Tl, where Tipp is the 2,4,6-triisopropylphenyl group.

Polyhapto ligands
Coordination numbers become ambiguous when dealing with polyhapto ligands.
For π-electron ligands such as the cyclopentadienide ion [C5H5]−, alkenes and the cyclooctatetraenide ion [C8H8]2−, the number of adjacent atoms in the π-electron system that bind to the central atom is termed the hapticity. In ferrocene the hapticity, η, of each cyclopentadienide anion is five, Fe(η5-C5H5)2. Various ways exist for assigning the contribution made to the coordination number of the central iron atom by each cyclopentadienide ligand. The contribution could be assigned as one since there is one ligand, or as five since there are five neighbouring atoms, or as three since there are three electron pairs involved. Normally the count of electron pairs is taken.

Surfaces and reconstruction
The coordination numbers are well defined for atoms in the interior of a crystal lattice: one counts the nearest neighbors in all directions. The number of neighbors of an interior atom is termed the bulk coordination number. For surfaces, the number of neighbors is more limited, so the surface coordination number is smaller than the bulk coordination number.  Often the surface coordination number is unknown or variable.  The surface coordination number is also dependent on the Miller indices of the surface. In a body-centered cubic (BCC) crystal, the bulk coordination number is 8, whereas, for the (100) surface, the surface coordination number is 4.

Case studies
A common way to determine the coordination number of an atom is by X-ray crystallography. Related techniques include neutron or electron diffraction. The coordination number of an atom can be determined straightforwardly by counting nearest neighbors. 

α-Aluminium has a regular cubic close packed structure, fcc, where each aluminium atom has 12 nearest neighbors, 6 in the same plane and 3 above and below and the coordination polyhedron is a cuboctahedron. α-Iron has a body centered cubic structure where each iron atom has 8 nearest neighbors situated at the corners of a cube. 
The two most common allotropes of carbon have different coordination numbers. In diamond, each carbon atom is at the centre of a regular tetrahedron formed by four other carbon atoms, the coordination number is four, as for methane. Graphite is made of two-dimensional layers in which each carbon is covalently bonded to three other carbons; atoms in other layers are further away and are not nearest neighbours, giving a coordination number of 3.

For chemical compounds with regular lattices such as sodium chloride and caesium chloride, a count of the nearest neighbors gives a good picture of the environment of the ions. In sodium chloride each sodium ion has 6 chloride ions as nearest neighbours (at 276 pm) at the corners of an octahedron and each chloride ion has 6 sodium atoms (also at 276 pm) at the corners of an octahedron. In caesium chloride each caesium has 8 chloride ions (at 356 pm) situated at the corners of a cube and each chloride has eight caesium ions (also at 356 pm) at the corners of a cube.

Complications
In some compounds the metal-ligand bonds may not all be at the same distance. For example in PbCl2, the coordination number of Pb2+ could be said to be seven or nine, depending on which chlorides are assigned as ligands. Seven chloride ligands have Pb-Cl distances of 280–309 pm. Two chloride ligands are more distant, with a Pb-Cl distances of 370 pm.

In some cases a different definition of coordination number is used that includes atoms at a greater distance than the nearest neighbours. The very broad definition adopted by the International Union of Crystallography, IUCR, states that the coordination number of an atom in a crystalline solid depends on the chemical bonding model and the way in which the coordination number is calculated.

Some metals have irregular structures. For example, zinc has a distorted hexagonal close packed structure. Regular hexagonal close packing of spheres would predict that each atom has 12 nearest neighbours and a triangular orthobicupola (also called an anticuboctahedron or twinned cuboctahedron) coordination polyhedron. In zinc there are only 6 nearest neighbours at 266 pm in the same close packed plane with six other, next-nearest neighbours, equidistant, three in each of the close packed planes above and below at 291 pm. It is considered to be reasonable to describe the coordination number as 12 rather than 6. Similar considerations can be applied to the regular body centred cube structure where in addition to the 8 nearest neighbors there 6 more, approximately 15% more distant, and in this case the coordination number is often considered to be 14.

Many chemical compounds have distorted structures. Nickel arsenide, NiAs has a structure where nickel and arsenic atoms are 6-coordinate. Unlike sodium chloride where the chloride ions are cubic close packed, the arsenic anions are hexagonal close packed. The nickel ions are 6-coordinate with a distorted octahedral coordination polyhedron where columns of octahedra share opposite faces. The arsenic ions are not octahedrally coordinated but have a trigonal prismatic coordination polyhedron. A consequence of this arrangement is that the nickel atoms are rather close to each other. Other compounds that share this structure, or a closely related one are some transition metal sulfides such as FeS and CoS, as well as some intermetallics. In cobalt(II) telluride, CoTe, the six tellurium and two cobalt atoms are all equidistant from the central Co atom.
Two other examples of commonly-encountered chemicals are Fe2O3 and TiO2. Fe2O3 has a crystal structure that can be described as having a near close packed array of oxygen atoms with iron atoms filling two thirds of the octahedral holes. However each iron atom has 3 nearest neighbors and 3 others a little further away. The structure is quite complex, the oxygen atoms are coordinated to four iron atoms and the iron atoms in turn share vertices, edges and faces of the distorted octahedra. TiO2 has the rutile structure. The titanium atoms 6-coordinate, 2 atoms at 198.3 pm and 4 at 194.6 pm, in a slightly distorted octahedron. The octahedra around the titanium atoms share edges and vertices to form a 3-D network. The oxide ions are 3-coordinate in a trigonal planar configuration.

Usage in quasicrystal, liquid and other disordered systems 

The coordination number of systems with disorder cannot be precisely defined.

The first coordination number can be defined using the radial distribution function g(r):

where r0 is the rightmost position starting from r = 0 whereon g(r) is approximately zero, r1 is the first minimum. Therefore, it is the area under the first peak of g(r).

The second coordination number is defined similarly:

Alternative definitions for the coordination number can be found in literature, but in essence the main idea is the same. One of those definition are as follows: Denoting the position of the first peak as rp,

The first coordination shell is the spherical shell with radius between r0 and r1 around the central particle under investigation.

References

External links
 Meteorite Book-Glossary C
 A website on coordination numbers

Chemical bonding
Stereochemistry
Molecular geometry
Materials science
Coordination chemistry